Seve Benson (born 4 November 1986) is an English professional golfer.

Benson was born in Guildford, Surrey, and was named after European golfing legend Seve Ballesteros. As an amateur, he was a member of the English Golf Union's Elite A Squad, and won the Russian and Qatar amateur open championships. He went on to make the cut at each of those countries professional championships while still an amateur, finishing tied 58th in the Qatar Masters, and tied for 10th in the Russian Open.

Having turned professional towards the end of 2007, Benson attempted to win a place on the European Tour. He reached final stage of the qualifying school, but missed the 72 hole cut. However, by getting through to the final stage, he had already done enough to enable him to play on the second tier Challenge Tour in 2008.

Benson claimed his first professional win in May 2008 at the opening event of the PGA EuroPro Tour season. Later the same month he won for the first time on the Challenge Tour, at the Piemonte Open, where he set a new course record in the 3rd round. He also won the Ypsilon Golf Challenge in August, where he triumphed in a playoff, and finished 6th on the end of season money list, to graduate to the European Tour for 2009.

He was the last golfer to retain his card at the end of the 2009 season, finishing 120th on the Race to Dubai. After suffering injury in 2010, he played 2011 on a medical exemption, but was unable to retain his card and returned to the Challenge Tour.

Amateur wins
2006 Russian Amateur Open Championship, Tailhade Cup (Argentina)
2007 Qatar Amateur Open Championship

Professional wins (4)

Challenge Tour wins (3)

Challenge Tour playoff record (2–0)

PGA EuroPro Tour wins (1)

See also
2008 Challenge Tour graduates
2012 Challenge Tour graduates

References

External links

Seve Benson – profile on his management firm's official site

English male golfers
European Tour golfers
Sportspeople from Guildford
1986 births
Living people